was a Japanese actor, voice actor and narrator from Minami, Saitama Prefecture, Japan. He voiced the roles of Masuo Fuguta in Sazae-san and Jam Ojisan in Soreike! Anpanman. He also voiced Kame-Sennin during the last episodes of Dragon Ball Z and all of Dragon Ball GT, following Kōhei Miyauchi's death. He worked for the Tokyo Actor's Consumer's Cooperative Society until his death in 2020.

On August 5, 2019, it was announced that Masuoka had retired from his roles in Sazae-san and Soreike! Anpanman, which would be taken over by Hideyuki Tanaka and Kōichi Yamadera respectively.

Masuoka died on March 21, 2020 from rectal cancer.

Filmography

Television animation
Ashita no Joe (1970) – Tarō
Sazae-san (1979–2019) – Masuo Fuguta
Touch (1985–1987) – Toshio Asakura
Soreike! Anpanman (1988–2019) – Jam Ojisan
Ranma ½ (1991) – Toramasa Kobayakawa

Original video animation (OVA)
Mobile Suit Gundam 0080: War in the Pocket (1989) – Dick Lumnba

Theatrical animation
Cyborg 009 (1966) – 005 / Geronimo Junior

Video games
Everybody's Golf Portable (2004) – Tanaka

Unknown
Bravely Default – Sage Yulyana
Cutey Honey – Naojiro Hayami
Cybot Robotchi – Dr. Deko
Dragon Ball Z – Kame-Sennin (eps. 288-291)
Dragon Ball GT – Kame-Sennin
Dragon Ball: Yo! Son Goku and His Friends Return!! – Kame-Sen'nin
Dragon Ball Z: Budokai – Kame-Sennin
Dragon Ball Z: Budokai 3 – Kame-Sennin
Dragon Ball Z: Sparking! – Kame-Sennin
Dragon Ball Z: Sparking! Neo – Kame-Sennin
Dragon Ball Z: Sparking! Meteor – Kame-Sennin
Dragon Ball DS – Kame-Sennin
Dragon Ball: World's Greatest Adventure – Kame-Sennin
Dragon Ball DS 2: Charge! Red Ribbon Army – Kame-Sennin
Meitantei Holmes: Aoi Ruby no Maki / Kaitei no Zaiho no Maki – Jewelry Store Manager
Nagagutsu Sanjūshi – Big
Nichijou – Narrator (ep 3)
Nangoku Shōnen Papuwa-kun – Chappy
Sherlock Hound – George/Todd
Superbook – Gizmo (Zenmaijikake)
Tenchi Muyo! Ryo-Ohki – Galactic Police Commander
Voltes V – General Oka

Tokusatsu
Silver Kamen – Alien Room (ep. 12 - 13)
Android Kikaider – Orange Ant (ep. 3), Gold Wolf (ep. 11), Golden Bat (ep. 15), Black Chameleon (ep. 18), Green Mammoth (ep. 25 - 26), Red Squid (ep. 30), Black Echidna (ep. 34), Red Mine Toad (ep. 41 - 42)
Android Kikaider Movie – Multi Colored Sand Lizard
Kikaider 01 - Shadow Mummy (ep. 16), Poisonous Mendicant (ep. 17), Shadow Thorned Starfish No.02 (No.01 voiced by Setsuo Wakui) (ep. 23), Spaceman Robots (voiced by Akira Shimada, Tetsu Masuda) (ep. 39)
Inazuman - Wind Banbara (ep. 5), Devil Banbara (ep. 12)
Himitsu Sentai Gorenger – Shining Masked, Ironclaw Masked, Hatchet Masked, Phone Masked, Shellfish Masked, Clock Masked, Can opener Masked, Piano Masked,
Battle Fever J – Left Hand Monster
Dengeki Sentai Changeman – Gaata
Jikuu Senshi Spielban - DreampackerGosei Sentai Dairanger – Haniwa Ventriloquist  (ep. 16)B-Fighter Kabuto – Rock Shell Chamberlain DordHyakujuu Sentai Gaoranger – Narrator, Gao GodKamen Rider Hibiki Hyper Battle DVD – Madder Hawk

Dubbing
Live-actionBlue Steel (1993 Fuji TV edition) – Frank Turner (Philip Bosco)Child's Play 3 – Colonel Francis Cochrane (Dakin Matthews)Die Hard 2 (1994 TV Asahi edition) – Sgt. Al Powell (Reginald VelJohnson)Harlem Nights – Sgt. Phil Cantone (Danny Aiello)Muppet Treasure Island – Blind PewNational Lampoon's Christmas Vacation – Eddie Johnson (Randy Quaid)The NeverEnding Story III (1996 TV Asahi edition) – Mrs. Rockbiter
AnimationThe Rescuers Down Under'' – Doctor Mouse

Awards

References

External links
 Official agency profile 
 

1936 births
2020 deaths
Deaths from colorectal cancer
Japanese male video game actors
Japanese male voice actors
Male voice actors from Saitama (city)
Tokyo Actor's Consumer's Cooperative Society voice actors